Attu is an island in the Near Islands (part of the Aleutian Islands chain).  It is the westernmost point of the U.S. state of Alaska. The island became uninhabited in 2010, making it the largest uninhabited island to be politically part of the United States.

The Battle of Attu was the site of the only World War II land battle fought in the United States. The battlefield area is a U.S. National Historic Landmark.

However, since it is in the Eastern Hemisphere, being on the opposite side of the 180° longitude line of the contiguous 48 states, it can also be considered one of the easternmost points of the country (a second Aleutian Island, Semisopochnoi Island at 179°46′E, is the easternmost location in the United States by this definition). For purposes of calendar date, the International Date Line, however, passes to the west of Attu Island, making it the westernmost place in the United States with the same date.

The population in the 2010 census was 20 people, all at the Attu Station, though all inhabitants left the island later in the year when the station closed. It then became the largest uninhabited island in the United States.

In 1982, the only significant trees on the island were those planted by American soldiers at a chapel constructed after the 1943 battle when the Japanese occupation was over; they have since gone.

Although Attu Island is the westernmost body of land east of the International Date Line, its time zone is the same as other western Aleutian Islands, UTC−10, which means that locations to the south-southeast (such as the uninhabited Baker Island and Howland Island in UTC−12 and Niue, Midway Atoll and American Samoa in UTC −11) have earlier clocks.

History 
The name Attu is the Unangan language (Aleut) name for the island. Archaeological research of the large number of archaeological sites on the island suggests an estimated precontact population ranging from 2,000 to 5,000 Unangan (Aleut).

Attu, being the nearest to Kamchatka, was the first of the Aleutian Islands exploited by Russian traders. Russian explorer Aleksei Chirikov called the island Saint Theodore in 1742. Russians stayed on the island several years at a stretch to hunt sea otters. The Russians often clashed with the local Unangan population. After the initial wave of traders, European ships largely overlooked Attu.

World War II

The Aleuts were the primary inhabitants of the island prior to World War II. But, on June 7, 1942, six months after the Japanese attack on Pearl Harbor, the 301st Independent Infantry Battalion of the Japanese Northern Army landed on the island without opposition, one day after landing on nearby Kiska, which made Attu the second of the only two invasion sites on United States soil during the war. Earlier, American authorities had forcibly moved about 880 Aleuts from villages elsewhere in the Aleutian Islands to internment camps in the Alaska Panhandle, where about 75 of them died of various infectious diseases over two years.

However, Attu Village had not yet been evacuated when the Japanese invaded. At the time, Attu's population consisted of 45 native Aleuts and two white Americans, Charles Foster Jones (1879–1942), a radio technician, originally from St. Paris, Ohio, and his wife Etta (1879–1965), a schoolteacher, originally from Vineland, New Jersey. The village consisted of several houses around Chichagof Harbor. The 42 Attu inhabitants who survived the Japanese invasion were taken to a prison camp near Otaru, Hokkaidō. Twenty-one of them died while they were imprisoned. Mr. Jones, 63, was murdered by the Japanese forces almost immediately after the invasion. Mrs. Jones, 63, was subsequently taken to the Bund Hotel in Yokohama, Japan, which also housed Australian prisoners of war from the 1942 Battle of Rabaul in Papua New Guinea.  Later, Mrs. Jones and the Australian prisoners were held at the Yokohama Yacht Club from 1942 to 1944, and then at the Totsuka prisoner of war camp until their release in August 1945. Mrs. Jones died in December 1965 at age 86 in Bradenton, Florida.

Before the Attu villagers were returned to the U.S., the American government stated publicly that it was not aware of their status.

According to Gen. Kiichiro Higuchi, the Commander of the Japanese Northern Army, the invasion of Kiska and Attu was part of a threefold objective:
 To break up any offensives against Japan by way of the Aleutians.
 To place a barrier between the U.S. and Russia in case Russia decided to join the war against Japan.
 To make preparation for air bases for future offensive action.

In late September 1942, the Japanese garrison on Attu was transferred to Kiska, and then Attu was essentially left unoccupied, but American forces made no attempt to occupy Attu during this time. On October 29, 1942, the Japanese reestablished a base on Attu at Holtz Bay under the command of Lt. Col. Hiroshi Yanekawa. Initially, the garrison was about 500 troops, but through reinforcements, that number reached about 2,300 by March 10, 1943. No more reinforcements arrived after that time, owing mainly to the efforts of the U.S. naval force under Rear Admiral Charles "Soc" McMorris, and United States Navy submarines. McMorris had been assigned to interdict the Japanese supply and reinforcement convoys. After the sizable naval Battle of the Komandorski Islands, the Japanese abandoned their attempts to resupply its Aleutian garrisons by surface ships. From then on, only submarines were used for the resupply runs.

On May 11, 1943, the American operation to recapture Attu began. A shortage of landing craft, unsuitable beaches, and equipment that failed to operate in the appalling weather caused great difficulties in projecting any force against the Japanese. Many soldiers suffered from frostbite – because essential supplies could not be landed, or having been landed, could not be moved to where they were needed. Army vehicles would not work on the tundra. The Japanese defenders under Colonel Yasuyo Yamasaki did not contest the landings, but rather they dug in on high ground away from the shore. This resulted in bloody fighting: there were 3,929 U.S. casualties: 549 were killed, 1,148 were injured, 1,200 had severe cold injuries, 614 succumbed to infectious diseases, and 318 died of miscellaneous causes – largely from Japanese booby traps and from friendly fire. The Japanese were defeated in Massacre Valley. The death count for the Japanese was 2,035. The Americans then built "Navy Town" near Massacre Bay.

On May 29, the last of the Japanese forces suddenly attacked near Massacre Bay in one of the largest banzai charges of the Pacific campaign. The charge, led by Colonel Yamasaki, penetrated U.S. lines far enough to encounter shocked rear-echelon units of the American force. After furious, brutal, close-quarter, and often hand-to-hand combat, the Japanese force was killed almost to the last man: only 28 prisoners were taken, none of them officers. U.S. burial teams counted 2,351 Japanese dead, but it was presumed that hundreds more had been buried by naval, air, and artillery bombardments over the course of the battle.

The Japanese Navy, realizing that their position was now untenable, evacuated Kiska three months later.

The United States Army Air Forces (USAAF) built a larger airfield, the Alexai Point Army Airfield, and then used it on July 10, 1943, as the base for an air attack on the Japanese-held Kurile Islands, now a part of Russia. This was the first air attack on the Japanese "homelands" since the famous Doolittle Raid in 1942. Other attacks followed.

On April 11, 1945, in a period of only two hours, at least nine Japanese incendiary balloons sent to start forest fires in the United States West Coast were intercepted and shot down near Attu by USAAF P-38 Lightning aircraft.

Postwar

After the war, the survivors of the Otaru prison camp were shipped to other Aleutian islands or to the mainland of Alaska. The US government did not allow them to return, despite their intense desire to do so. The United States government decided to construct a LORAN station on the southern tip of Attu, at Theodore Point. This installation was manned by a crew of about twenty members of the United States Coast Guard. The equipment to build the station came out of Holtz Bay and was ferried on barges and landing craft to Baxter Cove, about one mile east of the station. Bulldozers were used to cut a road from Baxter Cove to Theodore Point.

In 1954, the station was moved to Casco Cove, near the former Navy Base at Massacre Bay. In 1960, it was moved to Massacre Bay.

The island previously had scheduled airline service to and from Anchorage (ANC) flown by Reeve Aleutian Airways (RAA) which in 1976 was operating two direct flights a week between ANC and Attu with Lockheed L-188 Electra turboprop aircraft via an en route stop either at Adak Airport or Shemya in the Aleutian Islands.  At the time, the airport on Attu was the westernmost airfield located in the U.S. to have scheduled passenger airline service.

In 1984, the "392" exchange in the 907 area code, which includes Attu (and whose rate center is on nearby Shemya Island), became the last telephone exchange in the United States to be upgraded to dial service.  Prior to that, all telephone calls placed to and from that exchange could only be placed with the assistance of an operator.

The battlefield area and subsequent military sites were declared a National Historic Landmark in 1985. The battlefield is now part of Aleutian Islands World War II National Monument.

In 1987, with the approval of the U.S. Department of the Interior, the government of Japan placed a monument on Engineer Hill, site of the hand-to-hand finale of the battle against the Japanese. An inscription, in Japanese and English, reads: "In memory of all those who sacrificed their lives in the islands and seas of the North Pacific during World War II and in dedication to world peace."

In July 2007, the boots and foot bones of a Japanese soldier were found on the island, and on May 23, 2008, the remains of two more Japanese soldiers were discovered by U.S. Coast Guard Petty Officer 3rd Class Richard Brahm, a public affairs specialist who was a documentarian for the remains recovery team. More remains were located at the burial site, but were left untouched with plans to return at a later time and have them exhumed properly.

On August 1, 2010, the United States Coast Guard LORAN station on Attu permanently ceased operation. On August 27, 2010, the station was decommissioned and the Coast Guard personnel left, leaving the island with no resident population.

On June 7, 2012, the 70th anniversary of the Japanese invasion, Senator Lisa Murkowski and United States Coast Guard Rear Admiral Thomas Ostebo dedicated a memorial to Attu Village, its residents who died in Japanese captivity, and the survivors who were unable to return.

In 2015, Attu Island was visited by pilot and world circumnavigator Michael Smith. The island was a crucial refueling stop for Smith as he made his way from Adak island in the Aleutian Islands to Japan. As the island is uninhabited, he had to first fly containers of fuel there and then return as part of the journey from Adak to Japan. He was advised against staying overnight as there are large rats on the island.

After three months of efforts in digging up and removing contaminated soil from the island in the summer of 2016 via funding from the Formerly Used Defense Sites program, it was expected that further efforts would be required to finish the environmental clean up of the island.

Demographics

Attu first appeared on the 1880 U.S. Census as the unincorporated Aleut village of "Attoo", which at the time consisted of the village on western Chichagof Harbor. It had 107 residents, consisting of 74 Aleuts, 32 "Creoles" (mixed Russian and Native) and 1 White resident. In 1890, it appeared as Attu. It did not return again on the census until 1930. It appeared on the 1940 census, two years before the Japanese invasion of the village and island. It did not return again until 1980, when it consisted of the naval station residents at Massacre Bay, and was made a census-designated place (CDP). It did not return on the 1990 census. The name was changed to Attu Naval Station and redesignated a CDP in 2000. It last appeared on the 2010 census, just before the closure of the station in August that year and the departure of its remaining residents.

Climate
The weather on Attu is typically cloudy, rainy, and foggy. High winds occur occasionally. Five or six days a week are likely to be rainy, and there are only about eight to ten clear days a year. The rest of the time, even if rain is not falling, fog of varying density is the rule rather than the exception. According to the Köppen climate classification system, Attu has a  subpolar oceanic climate (Cfc) closely bordering on a tundra climate (ET). For its latitude the climate is exceptionally chilly in the summer, with daytime maximum temperatures averaging in the mid-50s (°F), and a winter that is exceptionally warm given the extreme Subarctic climate found over the rest of Alaska.

Birding
Attu was an important location in the world of competitive birding, whose goal is to see or hear the largest possible number of bird species within a specific geographic area during a specific time period. Because it is so physically remote from other parts of North America, there are a number of bird species likely to be found on Attu that are not seen anywhere else on the continent. John Fitchen called the island "the Holy Grail of North American birding".

During his record-setting big year of 1998, in which he identified a record 745 species (later revised to 748), Sandy Komito spent 29 days (May 10 – June 7) on the island. Since the closure of Attu Station by the U.S. Coast Guard in 2010, access to the island by birders has been greatly restricted. In a 2010 interview on the subject, Al Levantin (one of Komito's competitors during the 1998 season) singled out inaccessibility of Attu as the factor that would make it nearly impossible to break Komito's record. However, Neil Hayward did break the record, by one species, in 2013 without visiting Attu.

Birding tours can still reach Attu but only by boat, following a multi-day trip from Adak Island.

Education
In the pre-World War II period, the Bureau of Indian Affairs (BIA) operated the sole school on the island. At the time of Attu's capture, the school had a single teacher who was a White American woman. , the uninhabited island is physically within the Aleutian Region School District.

See also
 Aleutian Islands Campaign
 Kiska
 List of National Historic Landmarks in Alaska
 National Register of Historic Places listings in Aleutians West Census Area, Alaska
 Peaceful River (Alaska)

Web references
 Attu Island: Blocks 1150 thru 1153 and 1155 thru 1170, Census Tract 1, Aleutians West Census Area, Alaska United States Census Bureau.

References

External links

 Attu Homepage

 Red White Black & Blue – feature documentary about The Battle of Attu
 Soldiers of the 184th Infantry, 7th ID in the Pacific, 1943–1945
 Suicidal Banzai charge in Attu : The 1st Gyokusai ordered  Suicide for the Emperor?
 ”Attu: North American Battleground of World War II”, a National Park Service Teaching with Historic Places (TwHP) lesson plan
 Aviation: From Sand Dunes to Sonic Booms, a National Park Service Discover Our Shared Heritage Travel Itinerary

 
Aleutian Islands campaign
Near Islands
Protected areas of Aleutians West Census Area, Alaska
World War II Valor in the Pacific National Monument
World War II on the National Register of Historic Places in Alaska
Islands of Alaska
Islands of Unorganized Borough, Alaska
Islands of Aleutians West Census Area, Alaska
Uninhabited islands of Alaska